Pélussin is a commune in the Loire department in central France. Pélussin is made up of three districts : Notre-Dame, Les Croix and at the very top, Virieu.

Population

See also
Communes of the Loire department

References

Communes of Loire (department)